The Roman Catholic Archdiocese of Dhaka is the  Latin, main Metropolitan Metropolitan diocese of the Roman Catholic Church in Bangladesh, but no longer the only one. It still depends on the missionary Roman Congregation for the Evangelization of Peoples.

The archdiocese's Marian mother church and thus seat of its archbishop is St. Mary's Cathedral in the national capital Dhaka. As senior Metropolitan in Bangladesh, it is the principal episcopal see of that country.  the Archbishop of Dhaka is Bejoy Nicephorus D'Cruze, formerly Bishop of Sylhet, having been appointed by Pope Francis in September 2020.

Ecclesiastical province 
Its ecclesiastical province still has as suffragan sees
 Roman Catholic Diocese of Dinajpur
 Roman Catholic Diocese of Mymensingh
 Roman Catholic Diocese of Rajshahi 
 Roman Catholic Diocese of Sylhet.

On 2 February 2017, it lost as suffragans the newly created Metropolitan Roman Catholic Archdiocese of Chittagong and both its suffragan sees: Barisal and Kulna.

History 
It was erected it as the Apostolic Vicariate of Eastern Bengal by Pope Pius IX on 12 February 1850.

It was promoted as Diocese of Eastern Bengal on 1 September 1886, and renamed as the Diocese of Dacca after its see in 1887.
 
On 25 May 1927 it lost territory to establish the Diocese of Chittagong, as its suffragan, but since 2017 itself a Metropolitan.

It was elevated to Metropolitan Archdiocese of Dacca by Pope Pius XII on 15 July 1950,
 
On 17 January 1952 it lost territory to establish the Apostolic Prefecture of Haflong.

It enjoyed its papal visit, from Pope Paul VI, in November 1970.
 
Pope John Paul II renamed it as the Archdiocese of Dhaka on 19 October 1982.
 
It enjoyed a second papal visit from Pope John Paul II in November 1986.

It lost territory on 15 May 1987 to establish the Diocese of Mymensingh and on 8 July 2011 again to establish the Diocese of Sylhet, as its suffragans.

Leadership

Ordinaries

Below is a list of individuals who have led the Archdiocese of Dhaka and its antecedent jurisdictions since its founding.

Apostolic Vicars of Eastern Bengal
 Thomas Oliffe (1850–1855), appointed Apostolic Vicar of Western Bengal
 Fr. Louis Verité (1855–1860), as Pro-Apostolic Vicar
 Pierre Dufal (1860–1876), resigned; in 1878, appointed Coadjutor Bishop of Galveston, U.S.
 Giordano Ballsieper (1878–1886)

Bishops of Dhaka
 Augustin Louage (1890–1894)
 Peter Joseph Hurth (1894–1909), appointed Bishop of Nueva Segovia, Philippines
 Frederick Linneborn (1909 –1915)
 Amand-Théophile-Joseph Legrand (1916–1929)
 Timothy Joseph Crowley (1929–1945)
 Lawrence Leo Graner (1947–1950 see below)

Archbishops of Dacca
 Lawrence Leo Graner (see above 1950–1967)
 Theotonius Amal Ganguly (1967–1977)

Archbishops of Dhaka
 Michael Rozario (1977–2005)
 Paulinus Costa (2005–2011)
 Patrick D'Rozario (2011–2020)
 Bejoy Nicephorus D'Cruze (2020–present)

Coadjutor bishops
Under the Code of Canon Law, the coadjutor bishop has the right of succession (cum jure successionis) upon the death, retirement or resignation of the diocesan bishop he is assisting.  All coadjutor ordinaries eventually succeeded to become head of the Archdiocese of Dhaka or its antecedent jurisdictions.

Timothy Joseph Crowley (1927–1929)
Theotonius Amal Ganguly (1965–1967)
Patrick D’Rozario (2010–2011)

Auxiliary Bishops
Theotonius Amal Ganguly (1960–1965), appointed coadjutor of this archdiocese
Shorot Francis Gomes (2016–2021), appointed Bishop of Sylhet
Theotonius Gomes (1996–2014)

Statistics
As per 2014, it pastorally served 64,960 Catholics (0.3% of 23,539,280 total) on 12,000 km2 in 18 parishes and 14 missions with 115 priests (42 diocesan, 73 religious), 695 lay religious (132 brothers, 563 sisters) and 17 seminarians.

See also 
 Archbishop's House, Ramna Thana
 Roman Catholicism in Bangladesh
 List of Roman Catholic dioceses in Bangladesh

References

Sources and external links
 GCatholic.org with incumbent bio links
 Catholic-Hierarchy

Religious organizations established in 1850
Roman Catholic dioceses in Bangladesh
Roman Catholic dioceses and prelatures established in the 19th century
Roman Catholic ecclesiastical provinces in Bangladesh
 
1850 establishments in India
Roman Catholic bishops of Dhaka